Mahyar Alizadeh (born 5 January 1982) is an Iranian musician, composer, singer and Taar player.

After graduating from Alborz High School, he continued his career in music university and after that, decided to study in foreign universities. First he entered Komitass Conservatory in Armenia. As it influenced his passion on music as he always quotes that his career as a musician is divided in two, before Armenia and after that.

After two years studying music composition at Armenia Conservatory, he chose Vienna University as the next stop in mastering musicology.
Then in 2009 he resumed recording his debut album in collaboration with Alireza Ghorbani, an album that was begun when he was in Armenia. This album, named Autumn on Fire and labelled under Avay-e Barbad production, became the best selling Persian music album in 2011–2012.
These successes make Mahyar Alizadeh and Alireza Ghorbani's cooperation last till today in various albums and concerts.
Among his other and recent activities are music composition for movies, TV series and animations; music composition for the album Dancing in the Flames with you cooperating with Saber Abar ; and music composition for an album in which Homayoun Shajarian and Alireza Ghorbani participated together. His next album, Fairy-like Girl, which was published in 2015 / 1394 SH in cooperation with Alireza Ghorbani is one of the ten best-selling albums in Iran this year. Alizadeh is now working on several other projects with the voices of various singers such as Mehran Modiri and Mohammad Motamedi.

Achievements
Mahyar Alizadeh achievements to now :
Collaboration with Keyvan Saket as Taar player, music producer and record supervisor
Composing and Forming Harigh-E Khazan Album featuring Alireza Ghorbani on vocals
Composing film score (soundtrack) of  "Pardeh Neshin" series singing by Alireza Ghorbani and directed by Behruz Shoaibi
Composing film score (soundtrack) of  "Angels Descend Together" directed by Hamed Mohammadi, 32nd Fajr Film Festival
Composing and Forming "Fairy-like Girl()" Album featuring Alireza Ghorbani on vocals
Composing and Forming "Dancing in the flames with you" Album featuring Saber Abar and Pantea Panahina on narrators
Composing and Forming "You weren`t there" Album featuring Hadi Feizabadi on vocals
Composing and Forming "Without Me" Album featuring Mahyar Alizadeh on vocals
Foundation of the Persian Contemporary Music Ensemble in Vienna.
Recording project in Czech TV studio with Prague Metropolitan Philharmonic Orchestra (April 2014)
Forming new Album featuring Alireza Ghorbani and Homayoun Shajarian on vocals
Composing animation film score (soundtrack) of The Orange Tree (Derakht-e Portaghali), which was directed by Amir Houshang Moin
Composing and Forming New Album with Fardin Khalatbari featuring Mohammad Motamedi on vocals
Composing and Forming New Album featuring Mehran Modiri on vocals

Composing the orchestral album with two singers
Mahyar Alizadeh released another album after the successful release of his Harigh-E Khazan album. This album is a joint work between the two Iranian youth and promising singers, Alireza Ghorbani and Homayoun Shajarian.

Concerts
Concert in Tehran, AUTUMN ON FIRE and new sounds with Alireza Ghorbani on vocals in Tehran, Iran, Vahdat Hall, in 5 nights, with Sohrab Kashef conducting, Ali Jafary-Pouyan as Concert Master ( 26–30 September 2013)
Concert in Vienna, covering Mahyar Alizadeh's plays, performed by the Persian Contemporary Music Ensemble with Iman Khammar conducting and Andrea Purtic, Anais Hardouin-Finez and Alireza Araqhi Moqadam on vocals.
Concert in Vienna AUTUMN ON FIRE with Alireza Ghorbani on vocals and Milena Arsovska as Soprano and Anais Hardouin-Finez as Mezzo Soprano. (1 February 2013)
Concert in Vienna, the modern hits of Mahyar Alizadeh (6 July 2013)
Europe tour, performing AUTUMN ON FIRE and new sounds, scheduled for November 2013 in Germany, the Netherlands, Austria, Switzerland & Sweden.
Concert in Düsseldorf, Germany with Düsseldorf Young Philharmonic Orchestra (27 September 2014)
The concert Dancing in the Flames with you; with Saber Abar and Pantea Panahiha as singers, and Mahyar Alizadeh as composer at the Vahdat Hall (24 July 2015 / 2 Mordad, 1394 SH)
The concert Fairy-like Girl, with Alireza Ghorbani as singer and Mahyar Alizadeh as composer within the framework of 10 performances at the Vahdat Hall (8–12 June, 17 June, 8–10 July; 2016 / 19–23 Khordad, 28 Khordad, 18–20 Tir; 1395 SH)

Albums
2012 – Harigh-e Khazan
2014 – New album with 2 singers – Alireza ghorbani & Homayoun Shajarian – coming
2015 – Dancing in the flames with you
2016 – Fairy Like Girl
2017 – New Album with Fardin Khalatbari featuring Mohammad Motamedi on vocals – coming soon
2017 – New Album featuring Mehran Modiri on vocals – coming soon
2018 – You weren't there
2019 – Without Me

Filmography
2013 – ANGELS DESCEND TOGETHER()
2014 –  Behind the scene
2016 –  Saffron
2016 –  Dorehami

Soundtrack

The Hermit (Pardeh-neshin), TV series
The Hermit is Mahyar Alizadeh's second experience in music composition for film. The director of this series is Behrouz Shoeibi and its theme music is sung by Alireza Ghorbani.

Saffron, TV series
The series Saffron with the directorship of Hamed Mohammadi was broadcast by the IRIB TV1 in Norouz, 2016 / 1395 SH. Actors such as Mahdi Hashemi, Narges Mohammadi and Setareh Eskandari played in this series. The film score for this series was composed by Mahyar Alizadeh.

Theme music for TV programs

Sakene Tabaghe ye Vasat, film
The track "Bigharar" from the album Harigh-e Khazan was chosen as the music for the end credits of the film Sakene Tabaghe ye Vasat directed by Shahab Hosseini.

Dorehami
This program is a performance-based show which is made up of various items including talk show, stand-up comedy, etc. The music composition for the theme song of this program is done by Mahyar Alizadeh, and the singing is done by Mehran Modiri.

Theater Music

They’re watching us! (Negaheman mikonand)
Composition of the background music for the play Negaheman mikonand, directed by Mohammadreza Asli and produced by Shahnam Shahbaz Zadehbar, is done by Mahyar Alizadeh. This piece was played at Ostad Nazerzadeh Kermani Hall in Iranshahr on Tuesday, 19 January – Friday, 12 February 2016 (Tuesday, 29 Dey – Friday, 23 Bahman, 1394 SH).

Animation music

The Orange Tree (Derakht-e Portaghali)
The animation Derakht-e Portaghali, which was directed by Amir Houshang Moin and whose film score was composed by Mahyar Alizadeh, could achieve the best animation award and the honorary diploma at the eighth animation festival and the eighteenth cinema festival.

Judging as jury member
At the thirty-first Fajr Music Festival (2015), Mahyar Alizadeh was chosen as a jury member and made criticisms and judgments about the works participating in this festival.

Art Timeline
 2012 : Release of Harigh-E Khazan album
 2013: Composing the film score (soundtrack) of "Angels Descend Together" directed by Hamed Mohammadi, 32nd Fajr Film Festival
 2014: Composing the film score (soundtrack) of "Pardeh Neshin()" series singing by Alireza Ghorbani and directed by Behruz Shoaibi
 2015: Releasing the "Dancing in the flames with you" album
 2015: publication of the album "Fairy-like Girl()" album
 2015: music composition for the show Dorehami with Mehran Modiri as singer
 2015: the film score of the TV series Saffron, directed by Hamed Mohammadi, and background music for the credits with Mehran Modiri as singer
 2016 : film score of the animation Derakht-e Portaghali
 2017 : music composition and compilation album, cooperating with Fereydoun Khalatbari and with Mohammad Motamedi as singer
 2017 : music composition and compilation album, with Mehran Modiri as singer
 2018 : Release of You weren't there album
 2019 : Release of Without Me album

Awards and honors
In the fifth annual survey of The MUSICEMA – the first annual celebration of MUSICEMA– which became the largest survey of Iranian music history, Mahyar Alizadeh was selected by the experts with his first album "Harigh-e Khazan", as the best Traditional Music Album of 1391 (2012).
The Harigh-e Khazan is the first album of Mahyar Alizadeh and is in the best-selling albums of 1391(2012).
The film score (soundtrack) of "Pardeh Neshin" series was nominated for the best television series’ and movies’ film score (soundtrack), at the fifteenth HAFEZ-PRIZE in 1394 (2014).
The Pardeh Neshin piece composed by Mahyar Alizadeh, won the Award of the best traditional piece out of the album on People's Choice at the third annual celebration of MUSICEMA 1394 (2015).
The album Dancing in the Flames with you, nominee for the Barbad award for the best compilation album at the thirty-first Fajr Music Festival 1394 (2015)

References

External links

 Mahyar Alizadeh On Itunes
 Mahyar Alizadeh On Spotify
 Official homepage
 Official homepage of Persian Contemporary Music Ensemble
 Mahyar Alizadeh APARAT Channel
 Mahyar Alizadeh YOUTUBE Channel
 Mahyar Alizadeh SOUNDCLOUD Channel

1981 births
People from Tehran
Iranian composers
Living people
Iranian musicologists
Persian classical musicians
University of Tehran alumni
Barbad award winners